The 1987 MAAC men's basketball tournament was held February 28–March 2, 1987 at Meadowlands Arena in East Rutherford, New Jersey.

Seventh-seeded Fairfield defeated  in the championship game, 73–70, to win their second MAAC men's basketball tournament.

The Stags received an automatic bid to the 1987 NCAA tournament.

Format
All eight of the conference's members participated in the tournament field. They were seeded based on regular season conference records.

Bracket

References

MAAC men's basketball tournament